Rameez Junaid and Frank Moser were the defending champions but Moser decided not to participate.
Junaid played alongside Purav Raja and reached the final but lost to Arnau Brugués-Davi and João Sousa 7–5, 6–7(4–7), [11–9].

Seeds

Draw

Draw

References
 Main Draw

Franken Challenge - Doubles
2012 Doubles